South American Initiative (SAI) is a non-governmental 501(c)(3) organization with the purpose of providing assistance to every country of South America such as Argentina, Bolivia, Brazil, Chile, Colombia, Ecuador, Guyana, Paraguay, Peru, Suriname, Uruguay and Venezuela.

SAI works to raise awareness about the poorest of living conditions in South America, while offering solutions to help pave the way to a better future. The need for the creation of this organization resulted in a simple but striking phrase: Building a Brighter Tomorrow, Today.

Mission 
To transform people’s lives by giving them humanitarian aid in their greatest time of need.

History 
South American Initiative was founded in 2016 by S. Malca, a young philanthropist, after realizing the difficulties that many communities in South America are dealing with. Malca resides in South Florida, home of one of the largest South American community in the continent. Malca formed a work team made up of volunteers committed to work for the well-being of the most underprivileged population from South American countries.

Malca was able to analyze, from a humanitarian perspective, the serious crisis that many nations from South American are facing and as day by day they have sunk into extreme poverty. This disparity led Malca to create this organization. SAI began operating in Venezuela providing humanitarian aid to hospitalized patients, orphaned children, the homeless, elderly who have been abandoned and forgotten in nursing homes and families who do not have to eat.

Six Campaigns & Projects 
By 2017, SAI had already helped more than 3,500 people through its six main campaigns and projects: Help Venezuela, Help Venezuelan hospitals, Help Venezuelan Orphans, Venezuela Zoo Animal Rescue Program, Help Abandoned Pets: Providing Food and Care and Latin American Education Fund. More projects will be developed in the future.

Campaigns or Projects

Help Venezuela 
Life in Venezuela has dramatically changed since 2014. Today people wait in lines near supermarkets day-by-day waiting for a portion of rationed food that will only feed one or two members of the family for one week. Food shortages are rampant and many people waiting in line all day have had to leave the supermarkets with empty arms.

Since the country suffered from hyperinflation since 2016, its people have dealt with unimaginable consequences.

The average Venezuelan has lost nearly 24 lbs. After the economic crisis started, there has been looting and violence  in the streets leaving wounded people without access to medical-care and essential provisions. South American Initiative is committed to the people of Venezuela in providing a helping hand to each person who is in a vulnerable situation to offer food, clothing, footwear, drinking water, medical care, and education.

Help Venezuelan Hospitals 
In a country where it seems that the only thing that predominates is political affairs, the healthcare system is declining more and more. Every day, articles have been published in the press denouncing the poor state of the main public hospitals in Venezuela. Increasingly, the health crisis and  the shortage of food and medicine are prevalent throughout the country. This project will go toward feeding vulnerable adults and children in different hospitals and providing them with essential medicines.

Since the beginning of this project, the South American Initiative team has been on a mission to provide enough meals and clean drinking water to orphaned children and hospitalized adults to cover their needs for a healthy diet. SAI always provides the help new moms require to take care of their babies like diapers, formula, feeding bottles, medicine and other supplies needed to care of new moms and just born infants.

Help Venezuelan Orphans 
Many children in Venezuela are abandoned, some of them arrive at different hospitals, and at orphanage doors tucked inside cardboard boxes and backpacks. In the worst cases some newborns are found in the trash abandoned but still living.

The economic crisis the country is going through has caused many parents to abandon their children because they do not have the money to feed them. Parents know that the only chance their children have of surviving this political and economic crisis is to give them up to local orphanages. Many of these children arrive in a situation of critical malnutrition.

Venezuela Zoo Animal Rescue Program 
Due to current government corruption and a tense political environment, Venezuela’s zoo animals are not getting the help they need. Private zoos are suffering because of the economic crash and non-existent tourism as a result of the crisis.

Public zoos suffer the worst because of the lack of funds, theft, and corruption. The challenge of SAI is to identify the needs of private and public zoos and provide the food and medical care they need to keep the animals alive and healthy.

South American Initiative is stepping in to fill this gap by providing food and essential medical care to the neglected animals suffering in these unsupported zoos. SAI currently works with two zoos and one animal refuge to provide food and medical care with additional plans to work with more.

The South American Initiative’s long-term goal is to feed sick and neglected animals with proper care and nutrition in all the zoos throughout Venezuela.

Help Abandoned Pets: Providing Food and Care 
After seeing the large number of sick pets abandoned in the streets, South American Initiative has developed relationships with animals nonprofits in order to provide the resources needed to care for these animals and prevent diseases to public health.

The crisis and the shortages in Venezuela not only affect people, but also their pets. Dog owners in Venezuela have been forced to abandon their pets. The price of dog food has increased by more than 50% and exceeds $4 per kilogram. That's why there are more abandoned dogs in the streets than ever before. The truth is that these innocent, domesticated pets cannot survive without human help and care.

Among the possible solutions to the problem of stray dogs in the streets include the promotion of responsible pet ownership and understanding that having an animal is a privilege and a great responsibility. Another solution is to strengthen the help for all non-profit animal organizations, providing funds for sterilization campaigns, animal food, treatments for fleas, scabies, rabies, and other diseases.

Latin American Education Fund 
Venezuela is currently undergoing an extreme crisis due to the political and economic unrest in the country. As a result, many individuals flee to the United States looking for help and the opportunity to start a new and better life. The issue is that when they take refuge in the United States, they do not have the education to have access to the multiple job opportunities that the United States offers.

Most of the individuals that come to this country arrive with absolutely nothing other than the clothes on their backs. With little to give, these immigrants have few skills to support themselves. To make the situation more difficult, many do not speak English and cannot communicate to start their journey to a better life.

A proper education, is a stepping stone to a brighter future for those needing to start fresh in a country they are not familiar with. With an education, Venezuelans have better chances of finding a job to support themselves and their families. This program will help many to start new lives so they can support themselves and lead independent lives.

See also 
 Shortages in Venezuela
 Crisis in Venezuela (2010–present)

References

External links 
 

International nongovernmental organizations
Charities based in Florida
Humanitarian aid organizations
Organizations established in 2016